This article is a list of seasons completed by the Sacramento Kings of the National Basketball Association (NBA). They were formerly known as the Rochester Royals, Cincinnati Royals, the Kansas City-Omaha Kings, and the Kansas City Kings. While the Kings were created first as a semiprofessional team in 1923 with the Rochester Seagrams, their professional roots began in 1945 with their arrival in the National Basketball League, where it won the title in their first season. They joined the Basketball Association of America in 1948, with the league soon rebranding itself as the NBA. The Royals won the NBA title in 1951. After reaching the postseason ten times in twelve professional seasons, they moved to Cincinnati, Ohio in 1957. After fifteen years of mediocrity, they moved to Kansas City, Missouri in 1972, for which they played games in Kansas City and in Omaha, Nebraska. After thirteen years of mediocrity, they moved to Sacramento, California in 1986. An attempt to change ownership by way of selling the team and moving to Seattle failed in 2013. Vivek Ranadivé purchased the team later that year.

As of the 2021-22 season, the Kings have set an NBA record in futility, having accomplished consecutive seasons without a playoff appearance at 16, breaking the tie of 15 playoff-less seasons that was compiled by the Los Angeles Clippers between 1976-77 and 1990-91, with every single one of those season seeing them finish below .500,  which is also a record. Since 1945, the team have reached the postseason just 32 times, ten each in Sacramento and Rochester. 

They have not reached the NBA Finals in 71 years (a record), have not reached a Conference Finals in twenty seasons (tied for 5th for most seasons in history), and have not won a playoff series in eighteen seasons (tied for a record).

As one of the original eight NBA teams, they have the most losses in league history.

Seasons

All-time records

NBA records

NBL records

References

seasons
Events in Sacramento, California